The Rains Came is a 1939 20th Century Fox film based on an American novel by Louis Bromfield (published in June 1937 by Harper & Brothers). The film was directed by Clarence Brown and stars Myrna Loy, Tyrone Power, George Brent, Brenda Joyce, Nigel Bruce, and Maria Ouspenskaya.

A remake of the film was released in 1955 under the name The Rains of Ranchipur.

Plot

The story centers on the redemption of its lead female character, Lady Edwina Esketh. Tom Ransome is an artist who leads a rather dissolute, if socially active life in the fictional town of Ranchipur, India. His routine is shattered with the arrival of his former lover, Lady Edwina Esketh, who has since married the elderly Lord Esketh. Lady Edwina first sets out to seduce, then gradually falls in love with, Major Rama Safti who represents the "new India."

Ranchipur is devastated by an earthquake, which causes a flood, which causes a cholera epidemic. Lord Esketh dies and Lady Esketh renounces her hedonistic life in favor of helping the sick alongside Major Safti. She accidentally drinks from a glass that has just been used by a patient, becomes infected and dies, making it possible for Safti to become the ruler of a kingdom that he will presumably reform. In the course of the story, a missionary's daughter, Fern Simon, and Ransome also fall in love.

Cast

 Myrna Loy as Lady Edwina Esketh
 Tyrone Power as Major Rama Safti
 George Brent as Tom Ransome
 Brenda Joyce as Fern Simon
 Nigel Bruce as Lord Albert Esketh
 Maria Ouspenskaya as Maharani
 Joseph Schildkraut as Mr. Bannerjee
 Mary Nash as Miss MacDaid
 Jane Darwell as Aunt Phoebe – Mrs. Smiley
 Marjorie Rambeau as Mrs. Simon
 Henry Travers as Rev. Homer Smiley
 H. B. Warner as Maharajah
 Laura Hope Crews as Lily Hoggett-Egburry
 William Royle as Raschid Ali Khan
 C. Montague Shaw as General Keith
 Harry Hayden as Rev. Elmer Smiley
 Herbert Evans as Bates

Casting
The casting apparently was a lengthy process. Loy and Brown were loaned to 20th Century Fox from MGM (as part of a deal wherein Power was loaned by Fox to MGM for Marie Antoinette). Brent was also on loan from his home studio of Warner Bros. The only cast member who was originally chosen for the role he or she played was Ouspenskaya, who was memorable as the Maharani. She later claimed that she learned all she needed to know about impersonating Indian royalty from her acquaintance with the Russian Grand Duchess Maria Pavlovna of Russia.

Production
The budget was $2.5 million ($ million in ).

Bruce is cast against what had become his established type.

In later years, Loy recalled that her belief in director Clarence Brown made her willing to try his suggestion for her death scene: "'...people don't die with their eyes closed... Why don't you try dying with your eyes open? You've just got to hold your breath.' I held my breath, staring at some fixed object until I began to see stars and everything started to blur and run together. I was turning a little blue when he finally called 'Cut!' When you trust a director, you'll do anything for him."

Loy's stylish bad girl role harks back to the vamps, villainesses and dramatic leads she was known for until her success in The Thin Man established her comedic talent. After a series of romantic comedies, Loy wanted a good dramatic role, and this was it. According to Loy, Louis Bromfield told her, "I think you're giving the best performance of your career." After the Second World War and her appearance in The Best Years of Our Lives, her image changed yet again, to that of the ideal mother.

The special effects that produced the earthquakes and floods won the first Oscar issued in that category (see below). However, Variety praised the human drama: "The simple heroics following the quake are more effective than the earth-rending sequences themselves."

TCM.com reports some of cinematographer Arthur Miller's recollections about The Rains Came, including his "obsession" with the rain.

Original prints of the film were tinted sepia.

Accolades
It was nominated for six Academy Awards, winning in the category of Special Effects and Sound Effects, for the earthquake and flood sequences. It became the first film to win an Academy Award for Best Special Effects, edging out other nominees including The Wizard of Oz and Gone with the Wind.

1955 adaptation

The Rains Came was remade in 1955 as The Rains of Ranchipur,  with Richard Burton, Lana Turner and Fred MacMurray in the Power, Loy and Brent roles. The 1939 film uses the original novel's ending; the 1955 film provides different fates for Lord and Lady Esketh.

References

 Sources: Film commentary on the DVD The Rains Came

External links

 The Rains Came: A Novel Of Modern India. Harper & Brothers Publishers, 1937. From Internet Archive.
 Complete text of The Rains Came (public domain in Canada)
 
 
 
 

1939 films
1939 drama films
1930s disaster films
20th Century Fox films
American black-and-white films
American disaster films
American drama films
Films based on American novels
Films based on works by Louis Bromfield
Films directed by Clarence Brown
Films produced by Darryl F. Zanuck
Films scored by Alfred Newman
Films set in India
Films set in the British Raj
Films that won the Best Visual Effects Academy Award
Films shot in India
Films with screenplays by Philip Dunne
1930s English-language films
1930s American films